The 1953 Chatham Cup was the 26th annual nationwide knockout football competition in New Zealand.

The competition was run on a regional basis, with regional associations each holding separate qualifying rounds.

Teams taking part in the final rounds are known to have included Eastern Suburbs (Auckland), Huntly Thistle, Eastern Union (Gisborne), New Plymouth City, Napier Rovers, Wanganui United, St. Andrews (Manawatu), Seatoun (Wellington), Woodbourne (Marlborough), Riccarton, Northern (Dunedin), and Invercargill Thistle.

The 1953 final
The final was a repeat of the 1951 final, with Eastern Suburbs again beating Dunedin's Northern. Reg King added two further goals to his three from 1951, equalling the aggregate record of five final goals. The game was a thrilling one according to contemporary accounts, with Northern letting in a soft goal very early on and the game opening up with frequent chances at both ends. Suburbs clinched the match with the winning goal late on in the second half. Scorers were Reg King (2), Ken Fleet, and Murray Anderson for Eastern Suburbs, while Trevor McFarlane gained a brace for Northern and Bill Boardman also scored for the Dunedin side.

Results

Final

References

Rec.Sport.Soccer Statistics Foundation New Zealand 1953 page

Chatham Cup
Chatham Cup
Chatham Cup